National Secondary Route 109, or just Route 109 (or ) is a National Road Route of Costa Rica, located in the San José province.

Description
In San José province the route covers Goicoechea canton (Calle Blancos district), Moravia canton (San Vicente district).

References

Highways in Costa Rica